The 2009 International German Open was a men's tennis tournament played on outdoor red clay courts. It was the 103rd edition of the event known that year as the International German Open and was part of the ATP World Tour 500 series of the 2009 ATP World Tour. It took place at the Am Rothenbaum in Hamburg, Germany, from 20 July through 26 July 2009.

ATP entrants

Seeds

*Seedings based on 13 July 2009 rankings.

Other entrants
The following players received wildcards into the singles main draw
  Daniel Brands
  Florian Mayer
  Simon Greul
  Kevin Krawietz

The following players received entry from the qualifying draw:
  Potito Starace
  Victor Crivoi
  Pablo Cuevas
  Evgeny Korolev
  Pere Riba
  Marcel Granollers-Pujol

Finals

Singles

 Nikolay Davydenko defeated  Paul-Henri Mathieu, 6–4, 6–2
 It was Davydenko's first title of the year, and his 15th overall.

Doubles

 Simon Aspelin /  Paul Hanley defeated  Marcelo Melo /  Filip Polášek, 6–3, 6–3

References

External links
  
   
 Association of Tennis Professionals (ATP) tournament profile

 
International German Open
Hamburg European Open
2009 in German tennis